"All the Way to Reno (You're Gonna Be a Star)" is a song by American rock band R.E.M. It was released on July 23, 2001 as the second single from the band's twelfth studio album, Reveal (2001).  The single did not chart on the US Billboard Hot 100, but it did reach number 24 on the UK Singles Chart, number 31 in Italy, and number 34 in Ireland.

The B-side live performances were recorded at the South Africa Freedom Day concert in Trafalgar Square, London, which was held in honour of South African President Nelson Mandela. The event marked the 7th anniversary of democracy in South Africa.

Background
According to Peter Buck's sleevenotes to In Time: The Best of R.E.M. 1988–2003, the R.E.M. compilation on which this song also appears, the song describes someone who believes they can get famous if they go to Reno, Nevada. The working title of the song was "Jimmy Webb on Mars," which, according to Buck's notes, was a "sick tribute to a songwriter who we all admire."

Music video
The song's video was shot at Bishop Ford Central Catholic High School in the Prospect Park area of Brooklyn, New York. It was directed by Michael Moore and filmed by four students from the host school and other local schools: Chris, 17; Steve, 17; Andy, 18; Charlotte, 13; Roger, 18; and Juan, 17. In the video, Buck and Mike Mills can be seen entering the Career Guidance office with their respective instruments in hand, only to leave armed with nothing more than a dustpan and brush. Bertis Downs makes an appearance as the school's announcer, only to have his microphone commandeered by Michael Stipe.

The video was included with the iTunes Store bonus music videos released along with Part Lies, Part Heart, Part Truth, Part Garbage 1982–2011, the band's swan song and career-spanning compilation.  The song was not, however, included on the compilation itself.

Track listings
 All songs written by Peter Buck, Mike Mills, and Michael Stipe, except where indicated.

UK CD
 "All the Way to Reno (You're Gonna Be a Star)" – 4:44
 "Yellow River" (Christie) – 2:36
 "Imitation of Life" (Live) – 3:541
 "Imitation of Life" (Live) (enhanced video)1

UK DVD
 "All the Way to Reno (You're Gonna Be a Star)" (video)
 "Yellow River" (audio) – 2:36
 "165 Hillcrest" (audio) – 1:34

German CD
 "All the Way to Reno (You're Gonna Be a Star)" – 4:44
 "165 Hillcrest" – 1:34

1 Recorded at Trafalgar Square, London, England; April 29, 2001.

Charts

Release history

References

R.E.M. songs
2001 singles
2001 songs
Music videos directed by Michael Moore
Song recordings produced by Michael Stipe
Song recordings produced by Mike Mills
Song recordings produced by Pat McCarthy (record producer)
Song recordings produced by Peter Buck
Songs written by Michael Stipe
Songs written by Mike Mills
Songs written by Peter Buck
Warner Records singles